Lunan Bay railway station served the village of Lunan, Angus, Scotland from 1883 to 1964 on the North British, Arbroath and Montrose Railway.

History 
The station opened on 1 May 1883 by the North British, Arbroath and Montrose Railway.  The goods yard was to the west. The station closed to passengers on 22 September 1930 and closed to goods traffic on 18 May 1964.

References

External links 

Disused railway stations in Angus, Scotland
Former North British Railway stations
Railway stations in Great Britain opened in 1883
Railway stations in Great Britain closed in 1930
1883 establishments in Scotland
1930 disestablishments in Scotland